STV2 was a British local television network in Scotland, operating five city-based TV licences serving Glasgow, Edinburgh, Dundee, Aberdeen and Ayr. It was owned and operated by STV Group plc.

Initially broadcast as two separate stations – STV Glasgow and STV Edinburgh – the launch of three local licences in Aberdeen, Dundee and Ayr led to the launch of a single networked service on 24 April 2017. In May 2018, it was announced that STV2 would shut down at the end of June 2018 as part of a strategic review. It closed on 30 June 2018.

Overview
In January 2013, the broadcast regulator Ofcom announced STV had been awarded two licences to broadcast local TV services in the Glasgow and Edinburgh areas for a twelve-year period. The broadcaster pledged to run the channels in partnership with Glasgow Caledonian University and Edinburgh Napier University respectively.

Coinciding with a group-wide revamp, STV Glasgow began broadcasting at 6.30pm on Monday 2 June 2014, with the first edition of its flagship evening magazine programme, The Riverside Show. STV Edinburgh followed at 7pm on Monday 12 January 2015, launching with the first edition of The Fountainbridge Show.

In March 2015, STV won three further local TV licences for the Aberdeen, Dundee and Ayr areas under the working titles of Around Aberdeen, View from the Bridges and Ayrshire Today. No other bids were received for the three services.

The majority of STV2's programming was produced and broadcast from STV's headquarters at Pacific Quay in Glasgow. Unlike the main STV channel, where transmission originates in-house, playout and presentation were provided by Comux, the local TV multiplex operator, at its operations centre in Birmingham.

Programming
The five local TV services under the STV2 banner carried a single schedule of networked programming.

STV News aired bespoke half-hour bulletins for STV2 at 1pm and 10pm alongside a simulcast of the Edinburgh edition of STV News at Six. The network's flagship news programme, STV News Tonight aired each weeknight at 7pm and incorporated Scottish, UK and international news. The half-hour programme, presented by Halla Mohieddeen, was produced in partnership with ITN.

Non-news programmes for the channel included the early evening magazine Live at Five, Peter & Roughie's Football Show, Scottish Politics This Week, documentary series The People's History Show and chat shows including My Life in Ten Pictures and The Late Show with Ewen Cameron. Acquired programming included the Irish soap Fair City and Finnish drama Black Widows. Archive content included popular Scottish soap Take the High Road and crime drama Taggart.

List of programmes 

 Black Widows
 Bodo
 Britain by Bike
 Fair City
 Gordon Ramsay's Ultimate Cookery Course
 Gordon Ramsay's Ultimate Home Cooking
 Jak and Eddie's Scottish Kitchen
 Julie and Jimmy's Hot Woks
 The Late Show with Ewen Cameron
 Liberty's Great American Cookbook
 Live at Five
 Medics of the Glen
 Murder at 9
 My Life in Ten Pictures
 Off the Beaten Track
 On Weir's Way with David Hayman
 The People's History Show
 Peter & Roughie's Football Show
 Peter & Roughie's Saturday Football Show
 Scottish Politics This Week
 STV News Tonight
 Taggart
 Take the High Road
 Take Me
 Royal Upstairs Downstairs
 Secret State
 Scotland's City Safari
 Weir's Way

Closure 
STV announced in May 2018 that STV2 would close at the end of the following month due to low viewership and anticipated competition from the BBC Scotland channel set to launch in February 2019. The closure of STV2 resulted in the loss of 25 jobs with a further 34 cut in a reorganisation of STV's news output. The channel's broadcasting licences were sold to That's Media, owners of the That's TV network of local television stations. STV2 closed on 1 July 2018 after midnight, and its replacement, That's TV Scotland, launched on 15 October 2018.

References

External links

Local television channels in the United Kingdom
STV Group
Defunct television channels in Scotland
Television channels and stations established in 2017
Television channels and stations disestablished in 2018